"Chattery Teeth" is a short story by American writer Stephen King.  It was originally published in Cemetery Dance and was later collected in Nightmares & Dreamscapes.

Publication history 
Stephen King had been a regular reader of Cemetery Dance, a horror magazine, and sent an unsolicited short story to be published there in 1992.  The resulting publicity helped to raise their profile.

Plot summary 

In the story, salesman Bill Hogan notices an odd pair of walking "Chattery Teeth" (odd due to their unusually large size and the fact that they are made of metal) in a convenience store display. The clerk ends up giving Hogan the teeth, claiming they had been dropped and no longer work. Hogan is unable to dismiss another oddity- his sense that the teeth are somehow sentient and want to kill him.

As he leaves the convenience store, Hogan reluctantly (having been robbed by a hitchhiker once before) gives a ride to a hitchhiker outside the convenience store; his fears prove prophetic when the young man tries to carjack him and then kill him. During the struggle, Hogan wrecks the van, and before the hitchhiker can recover and kill him, the teeth come to life and gruesomely dispatch the criminal.  Hogan passes out to the vision of the Chattery Teeth dragging the hitchhiker's body off into the desert.

Nine months later, Hogan stops again at the same convenience store, where he is unexpectedly reunited with the "broken" teeth again. The store owner's wife recounts how a disheleved young man- Hogan's would-be carjacker and murderer- was found dead out in the desert, presumably killed by wild animals. Hogan realizes the teeth likely never intended to kill him, but instead want to protect him.  Mrs. Scooter gives him the teeth again. His theory is proved correct when a dog snarls at him as he leaves and the teeth stir in his pocket, ready to attack anything that means him harm. Hogan resolves to keep the teeth permanently, and to eventually pass them on to his son.

Reception 
George Beahm called it "quintessential King" and "a horrific little gem of a story".  Wiater et al. called it "a bizarre tale" and said that it is reminiscent of "The Monkey", a story collected earlier in Skeleton Crew.

Adaptations 
The short story was turned into a segment in the television movie Quicksilver Highway. The audiobook version was narrated by actress Kathy Bates.

References

See also 
 Stephen King short fiction bibliography

Short stories by Stephen King
Short stories adapted into films
1992 short stories
Works originally published in American magazines